Soul Fountain is an album featuring jazz saxophonist Clifford Jordan which was recorded in 1966 and but not released on the Atlantic Records subsidiary Vortex label until 1970.

Reception

The AllMusic review by Thom Jurek states: "as a jazz album with big fat grooves, stellar playing, and arrangements, it's a monster".

Track listing
All compositions by Clifford Jordan,except as indicated.
 "T.N.T." (Ben Tucker, Grady Tate, Bob Dorough) - 2:39    
 "I've Got a Feeling for You" - 3:00
 "H.N.I.C." (Tate, Tucker) - 3:32
 "I Got You (I Feel Good)" (James Brown) - 2:37
 "Caribbean Cruise" - 2:07
 "Señor Blues" (Horace Silver) - 5:42
 "Eeh Bah Lickey Doo" - 4:05
 "Retribution" (Abbey Lincoln) - 4:31

Personnel
Clifford Jordan — tenor saxophone, flute, piano
Jimmy Owens - trumpet, flugelhorn 
Julian Priester - trombone
John Patton - organ (tracks 6-8)
Frank Owens - piano, organ (tracks 1-5)
Ben Tucker - bass (tracks 1-5)
Bob Cranshaw - bass, electric bass (tracks 1-5)
Bobby Durham (tracks 1-5), Billy Higgins (tracks 6-8) - drums
Ray Barretto - congas (tracks 6-8)
Joe Wohletz - bongos, percussion
Orestes Vilato - percussion (tracks 1-5)

References

1970 albums
Clifford Jordan albums
Vortex Records albums
Albums produced by Arif Mardin